DaVita Inc. provides kidney dialysis services through a network of 2,816 outpatient dialysis centers in the United States, serving 204,200 patients, and 321 outpatient dialysis centers in 10 other countries serving 3,200 patients. The company primarily treats end-stage renal disease (ESRD), which requires patients to undergo dialysis 3 times per week for the rest of their lives unless they receive a donor kidney. The company has a 37% market share in the U.S. dialysis market. It is organized in Delaware and based in Denver.

In 2020, 68% of the company's revenues came from Medicare and other government-based health insurance programs. In 2020, 90% of the company's patients were covered by government-based health insurance programs. Commercial payers, which accounted for 32% of revenues in 2020, generate nearly all of the company's profit as they reimburse at a much higher rate than government-based health insurance programs.

The company is ranked 271st on the Fortune 500.

The name "DaVita" was derived from the Italian language phrase "Dare Vita", which means "giving life".

History
The company was founded in 1979 as Medical Ambulatory Care, Inc., a subsidiary of National Medical Enterprises, Inc. (now Tenet Healthcare).

In August 1994, 70% of the company was acquired by DLJ Merchant Banking Partners in a leveraged buyout for $75.5 million,  including a $10.5 million investment by DLJ. The company then changed its name to Total Renal Care Holdings, Inc.

In October 1995, the company became a public company via an initial public offering, raising $107 million.

By December 1996, DLJ had made a 386% return on its $10.5 million investment.

On February 27, 1998, the company acquired Renal Treatment Centers for $1.3 billion in stock.

The integration went poorly and in July 1999, the CEO and CFO resigned. After tripling in value between 1995 and 1998, by July 1999, the stock price was down 71% year-to-date.

In October 1999, Kent J. Thiry, then 43 years old, was named CEO.

In 2000, the company sold its non-U.S. operations.

In October 2000, the company was renamed DaVita Inc.

In October 2005, the company acquired Gambro Healthcare.

In October 2014, the company agreed to pay $350 million to settle claims that it provided illegal kickbacks to doctors.

In June 2015, the company agreed to pay $450 million to settle allegations that it unnecessarily disposed of drugs and then billed the U.S. federal government for this waste.

In June 2018, a jury awarded the families of 3 of the company's patients $383 million in wrongful death claims after the patients died from cardiac arrest after undergoing treatment at DaVita centers.

In July 2021, a federal grand jury indicted DaVita and former CEO Kent Thiry on charges of labor market collusion alleging participation in conspiracies with Surgical Care Affiliates to suppress competition for the services of certain senior-level employees. The company and Thiry were acquitted by a jury in April 2022.

Healthcare Partners
In 2012, DaVita acquired Healthcare Partners for $4.42 billion. In 2014, it acquired Colorado Springs Health Partners, with 600 employees and 110,000 patients. In March 2016, it acquired The Everett Clinic Medical Group, a 20-site physicians practice with 315,000 patients in the Seattle area, for $385 million. In September 2016, Healthcare Partners was renamed DaVita Medical Group. In May 2017, it acquired WellHealth Quality Care. In October 2018, it agreed to pay $270 million to settle allegations that it violated the False Claims Act by providing inaccurate information that caused Medicare Advantage Plans to receive inflated payments. James Swoben, a whistleblower, received $10 million. In June 2019, the division was sold to UnitedHealth Group's Optum division for $4.3 billion.

References

External links

Health care companies based in Colorado
Companies based in Denver
Renal dialysis organizations in the United States
Health care companies established in 1979
American companies established in 1979
1979 establishments in California
Companies listed on the New York Stock Exchange
1995 initial public offerings
Berkshire Hathaway